The Spectacles, Western Australia, a suburb of Perth, Western Australia
 The Spectacles Wetlands, a wetland in the above suburb
 The Spectacles (short story), a short story by Edgar Allan Poe
 The Spectacle Maker, a 1934 short film